Visitors to Pakistan typically must obtain a visa from one of the Pakistani diplomatic missions. Pakistani missions abroad offer various categories of visas, with some travelers eligible for visa on arrival if traveling as part of a group tour, or for business. Pakistan also offers electronic visa application and electronic travel authorization for issuance of visa on arrival.

Applicants must typically apply for visas in their country of origin, but may apply from a third country if they are legal permanent residents of that country.

Visa policy map

Visa-free entry 
Citizens from the following 2 countries who hold ordinary passports do not require a visa for Pakistan.

Electronic Travel Authorization

Tourism visa on arrival
Citizens of the 64 countries may obtain a visa on arrival in Pakistan for tourism purposes if they possess an ETA (electronic travel authorization):

Business visa on arrival

Nationals from the following 96 countries may obtain a visa on arrival when traveling on business for a maximum stay of 30 days, provided they have a local sponsor who must first obtain an approval from the immigration authorities at the intended port of arrival, and if they possess any one of the following documents:

 

 A recommendation letter from the Chamber of Commerce & Industries (CC&I) in the country of residence
 An invitation letter from a business organization recommended by the concerned trade organization/association in Pakistan
 A recommendation letter by Investor Consular of Board of Investment posted at Pakistan missions abroad

Online Visa
Citizens of all countries except the following are eligible to apply for an online visa:

Diplomatic and service category passports 

Pakistan has visa-abolition agreements for holders of diplomatic and official passports from the following countries, who do not require visas for Pakistan:

Mandatory registration 
Visitors from the following countries are obliged to register with the police upon arrival to Pakistan:

Police registration is typically performed by hotel staff as part of the check-in process. In person visits to police stations are only required of visitors who choose not to stay in licensed hotels or hostels.

Special categories

Overseas Pakistani citizens and Persons of Pakistani Origin 
Visas are not required for holders of a Pakistan Origin Card (POC, a National Identity Card for Overseas Pakistani (NICOP), or any passport bearing a "Visa exempt" stamp by Pakistani authorities

Nationals of Turkey holding a 
valid visa for the Schengen Area, United Kingdom or the United States, can obtain a visa on arrival.

Israeli passport holders 

Pakistan does not bar Israeli citizens from traveling to Pakistan. Though Pakistan has no diplomatic mission in Israel, applicants for Pakistani visas can apply in a third country if they are legal permanent residents in that country. Israeli passport holders, along with Palestinian Authority passport holders, are required to register their stay with local police authorities, unless granted a work visa.

Indian passport holders
Applications from Indian passport holders must be cleared directly from the Ministry of Interior, though they are not barred from visiting Pakistan despite being subject to additional regulations, including mandatory police registration, regardless of visa type. Foreigners of Indian origin were subject to this regulation as well. On 25 January 2019, the policy was revised for Indian Origin United Kingdom and United States Nationals. Indian nationals are also restricted in the availability of ports of entry to Pakistan, and instead must enter and leave the country via designated points, including the Wagah border, as well as through airports in Islamabad, Lahore, and Karachi. Indian nationals are typically required to enter and exit Pakistan through the same post, unless permission is sought in advance.

Indian passport holders are not granted tourist visas, and are only permitted to apply for visas to visit family and friends, business visas, transit visas, and visas for religious pilgrimage. Six month business visas are granted to Indian passport holders, with multiple entries permitted. Indian passport holders are also ineligible for any visa extensions, though passport holders who stay longer than the time permitted by the visa are subject to a fee of 40 Rupees per day of overstay. Indian residents applying for a tourism, visit or student Pakistani visa may especially face issues pertaining to their religious backgrounds. Many visa applicants have also expressed concerns for the extended process that allegedly takes almost twice as much time as other such visas as well as the on and off government imposed bans upon inter-country travels between India and Pakistan.

Visitor statistics 

Most visitors arriving in Pakistan on a short term basis were from the following countries:

See also 

 Visa requirements for Pakistani citizens
 Pakistani passport

References

External links

Pakistan Visa Online, (Government of Pakistan) Online Visa Portal
Bureau of Immigration

Pakistan
Foreign relations of Pakistan
Policies of Pakistan
Tourism in Pakistan
Immigration to Pakistan